Simple is a 2022 Spanish comedy television series created by Anna R. Costa for Movistar Plus+ based on the book  by . It stars Natalia de Molina, Anna Castillo, Anna Marchessi, and Coria Castillo as four women with functional diversity trying to live in an appartment in La Barceloneta.

Plot 
The plot concerns about the mishaps of four women with functional diversity (Nati, Marga, Patri, and Àngels) trying to live in a supervised apartment in La Barceloneta.

Cast

Production 
Consisting of 5 episodes featuring an average running time of 30 minutes, it is a Movistar Plus+ original series, produced in collaboration with  Destrucción y Salvación. Sandra Hermida is credited as producer.

Release 
The series was presented at the 70th San Sebastián International Film Festival on 20 September 2022. It will debut on Movistar Plus+ on 1 December 2022. Beta Film nabbed the international distribution rights.

Reception 
Enric Albero of El Cultural pointed out that the series ("a luminous comedy that reduces the ideological feverishness of the original") comes nowhere near the incendiary nature of the source material, even if it incorporates some political (anti-establishment) charge via the characters of Marga and, particularly, Nati, with the series otherwise managing to balance points of view and display an "agile" pace.

Reaction by Morales and answer by Costa 
The author of the original work, Cristina Morales (using the pen name 'Crispina Modales') denounced the whitewashing of the institutional violence exercised by social services (represented in the series by the character portrayed by Bruna Cusí) in the series so the latter could "reach the great democratic public, that great public that endows social services with messianic powers of integration in the shitty capitalism in which we live and that deliberately conceals the true nature of social workers" and derisively renamed the series as 'Nazi'. Costa explained that instead of the case of Morales' original work of all the characters working in such institution being "evil", she was interested in something "radically opposite" since the inception of the series. In Costa's vision, "institutions are one thing and the people working in them are another [different one]", thereby justifying the deviation from the original work by Morales. Upon the harsh criticism of the series by Morales, Costa also said that she "sincerely believed" that Morales' stance was "purely aesthetic", and claimed that Morales had previously told her that she had enjoyed the series and laughed a lot with Marga even if she did not agree neither with the portrayal of Nati nor with the absence of institutional violence. Costa also told that Morales "can shove the Nazi thing [down/up/in] wherever it fits her".

Accolades 

|-
| rowspan = "2" align = "center" | 2022 || rowspan = "2" | 28th Forqué Awards || rowspan = "2" | Best Television Actress || Anna Castillo ||  || rowspan = "2" | 
|-
| Natalia de Molina || 
|-
| rowspan = "3" align = "center" | 2023 || rowspan = "3" | 10th Feroz Awards || colspan = "2" | Best Comedy Series ||  || rowspan = "3" | 
|-
| Best Supporting Actress in a TV Series || Coria Castillo || 
|-
| Best Screenplay in a TV Series || Anna R. Costa, Cristina Pons || 
|}

References 

Upcoming comedy television series
Television shows about disability
Movistar+ original programming
2020s Spanish comedy television series
Spanish-language television shows
Television series based on Spanish novels
Television shows set in Barcelona
2022 Spanish television series debuts